Gundred or Gundreda (Latin: Gundrada) (died 27 May 1085) was the Flemish-born wife of an early Norman baron, William de Warenne, 1st Earl of Surrey. She and her husband established Lewes Priory in Sussex.

Life
Gundred was almost certainly born in Flanders, and was a sister of Gerbod the Fleming, 1st Earl of Chester, and thus daughter of Gerbod, hereditary advocate of the Abbey of Saint Bertin. She is explicitly so called by Orderic Vitalis, as well as the chronicle of Hyde Abbey. She was also the sister of Frederick of Oosterzele-Scheldewindeke, who was killed c.1070 by Hereward the Wake.

Gundred married before 1070 William de Warenne, 1st Earl of Surrey (d. 20 June 1088), who rebuilt Lewes Castle, making it his chief residence. Sometime between 1078 and 1082, Gundred and her husband set out for Rome, visiting monasteries along the way. In Burgundy they were unable to go any farther due to a war between Henry IV and Pope Gregory VII. They visited Cluny Abbey and were impressed with the monks and their dedication. William and Gundred decided to found a Cluniac priory on their own lands in England. They sent to Hugh, the abbot of Cluny, for monks to come to England at their monastery. Hugh was reluctant yet eventually sent several monks, including Lazlo, who became the first abbot. The house they founded was Lewes Priory, dedicated to St Pancras. Gundred died in childbirth on 27 May 1085 at Castle Acre, Norfolk, one of her husband's estates, and was buried at the chapter house of Lewes Priory. He was later buried beside her.

Tombstone

In the course of the centuries which followed, both tombstones disappeared from the priory. In 1774 Edward Clarke discovered Gundred's in Isfield Church (seven miles from Lewes), over the remains of Edward Shirley, Esq., who died in 1550. William Burrell had it removed on 2 October 1775 to St John's Church, Southover, where it was placed on display.

In 1845, during excavations through the Priory grounds for the Brighton Lewes and Hastings Railway, the lead chests containing the remains of the Earl and his Countess were discovered and were deposited temporarily beneath Gundred's tombstone. In 1847 a Norman Revival chapel was erected by public subscription, adjoining the present vestry and chancel. Before the remains were reinterred in this chapel, both chests were opened to ascertain if there were any contents, which was found to be the case. New chests were made and used, and the ancient ones preserved and placed in two recessed arches in the southern wall. The Earl's chest has lost some lead. Gundred's chest remains in a good state of preservation. Across the upper part of the right arch is the name Gvndrada. Her tombstone is of black Tournai marble.

Family
The children of William de Warenne and Gundred were:

William II de Warenne (d. 11 May 1138), buried in Lewes Priory.
Reginald de Warenne, an adherent of Robert of Normandy.
Edith de Warenne, married first Gerard de Gournay, Lord of Gournay-en-Bray and second Drew de Monchy.

Controversy on parentage
Claims based in part on the non-contemporary Lewes Priory cartulary suggested Gundred was a daughter of William the Conqueror by his spouse Matilda of Flanders, but this is not accepted by most modern historians. The early-19th-century writer Thomas Stapleton had argued she was a daughter of Matilda born prior to her marriage to Duke William. This theory sparked a debate consisting of a series of published papers. It culminated with those of Edmond Chester Waters and Edward Augustus Freeman, who argued the theories could not be supported. Nonetheless, this purported relationship between Gundred and the Conqueror continues to appear, despite being dismissed by modern scholars.

Notes

References

Additional references
 Barlow, Frank, The Feudal Kingdom of England 1012 - 1216, London, 1955
 Cokayne, George Edward, The Complete Peerage, Vol. iv, p. 670 Chart:Surrey or Warenne before 1135…
 Keats-Rohan, K.S.B., Domesday People, a Prosopography of Persons Occurring in English Documents 1066-1166 (The Boydell Press, Woodbridge, 1999), p. 480
 Moriarty, George Andrews, The Plantagenet Ancestry (Mormon Pioneer Genealogy Society, Salt Lake City, UT, 1985), p. 184
 
 Schwennicke, Detlev, Europäische Stammtafeln: Stammtafeln zur Geschichte der Europaischen Staaten, Neue Folge, Band III Teilband 4, Das Feudale Frankreich und Sien Einfluss auf des Mittelalters (Marburg, Germany: Verlag von J. A. Stargardt, 1989), Tafel 699
 Weis, Frederick Lewis, The Magna Charta Sureties, 1215, ed: Walter Lee Sheppard, Jr., William R. Beall, 5th Edition (Genealogical Publishing Co., 1999), Line 158-1

External links
 The Lewes Priory Trust Photo Gallery (copyrighted images) 
 The Gundrada Chapel, Southover Church, Lewes, East Sussex 
 Tomb of Gundred in 1787 The Gentleman's Magazine 

11th-century births
1085 deaths
Anglo-Normans
Surrey, Gundred, Countess of
People from Lewes
Anglo-Norman women
11th-century English people
Burials at Lewes Priory
11th-century English women